Sean Farrell Moran (born June 5, 1973 in Aurora, Colorado) was an American football defensive lineman in the National Football League for the Buffalo Bills, St. Louis Rams, and the San Francisco 49ers.  He played college football at Colorado State University.  Moran attended Overland High School.

1973 births
Living people
People from Aurora, Colorado
American football defensive ends
Buffalo Bills players
St. Louis Rams players
San Francisco 49ers players
Colorado State Rams football players
Ed Block Courage Award recipients